Western Channel Pile Light, also known as the West Wedding Cake due to its shape, is an active pile lighthouse located at the Sydney Harbour, New South Wales, Australia, off Georges Head at Mosman. It marks the western end of the Sow and Pigs Reef. It collapsed in December 2006 and was reconstructed and restored to operation in December 2008.

History 
Western Channel Pile Light was established in 1924, replacing a marker buoy, together with Eastern Channel Pile Light.
It was constructed from concrete bottom (originally known as the "gas house"), supported by twelve piles, with a copper top and a wooden stakes skirt. It was originally gas powered (probably a carbide lamp), and was later converted to solar power.

In 1996 a  stainless steel mast, serving as a weather station, was installed on the structure, providing information about weather conditions in the harbour.

The lighthouse was due for replacement in 2007, and a budget was set, but on 12 December 2006 it collapsed, as one or two of the supporting piles broke. The Sydney Ports Corporation employed Waterways Constructions to reconstruct the lighthouse. The new tower was designed to look as similar as possible to its predecessor, using the salvaged and renovated lantern house, and a new lower section. Reconstruction completed and the light returned to operation on 18 December 2008.

Site operation and visiting 
The light is operated by the Sydney Ports Corporation. It is accessible only by boat, and is closed to the public.

See also 

 List of lighthouses in Australia

Notes

References 

  Listed as "Western Channel Beacon."

External links 

 

Lighthouses completed in 1924
Lighthouses in Sydney
1924 establishments in Australia